The Texas Commission on Alcohol and Drug Abuse (TCADA) was a state agency of Texas, headquartered in Austin. The agency made efforts to prevent abuse of alcohol and recreational drugs among Texas residents. The passage of House Bill 2292 of the 78th Texas Legislature in 2003 merged four state agencies, including TCADA, into the Texas Department of State Health Services.

References

External links

 Texas Commission on Alcohol and Drug Abuse

State agencies of Texas
2003 disestablishments in Texas